Christopher Wiley Antley (January 6, 1966 – December 2, 2000) was an American National Champion and U.S. Racing Hall of Fame jockey.

Biography
He was born in Fort Lauderdale, Florida, and grew up in Elloree, South Carolina. He left school at sixteen to ride horses professionally at Pimlico Race Course in Baltimore, Maryland. His first win was on a horse named Vaya Con Dinero. Soon, he left Maryland to race in New York and New Jersey and at the age of 18 was the United States Champion Jockey by wins with 469.

In the late 1980s, Antley spent time in a substance abuse clinic. In 1987, he became the first rider to win 9 races on 9 different horses in a single day and in 1989, he won at least one race a day for 64 straight days.

In 1990, Antley moved to California. In 1991, he rode Strike the Gold to victory in the Kentucky Derby. In 1997, he temporarily retired to deal with weight and drug problems. Then in 1999, Antley returned to ride the D. Wayne Lukas-trained Charismatic, and they won that year's Kentucky Derby and Preakness Stakes.

In the 1999 Belmont Stakes, Charismatic finished third after injuring his leg in the stretch run.  Antley jumped off the horse after the finish line and attempted to hold him in place. Due in part to Antley's efforts, Charismatic recovered to stand at stud following surgery.

A stock market player, Antley wrote an investor newsletter he called "The Antman Report." During the week leading up to the 1999 Belmont Stakes, he was invited to ring the Opening Bell at the New York Stock Exchange.

In December 2000, Antley was found dead on the floor of his Pasadena, California, home. The cause of death was severe blunt force trauma and was investigated by police as a homicide.  Later, the coroner's report concluded that Antley had died of multiple drug overdose, and the injuries were likely related to a fall caused by the drugs.

Antley is interred in the Bookhart Cemetery in Elloree, South Carolina, the town he considered his home. Shortly after his death, his wife, Natalie Jowett, a former ABC Sports employee, gave birth to their daughter, Violet Grace Antley.

On April 20, 2015, Antley's induction into the National Museum of Racing and Hall of Fame was announced. His formal induction took place during ceremonies on August 7, 2015, in Saratoga Springs, NY.

A film about Charismatic and Antley was produced by Asylum Entertainment and directed by Steven Michaels, Joel Surnow, and Jonathan Kochas for ESPN's 30 for 30 series. It aired on Tuesday, October 18, 2011, at 8 p.m.

Triple Crown Record 

Kentucky Derby: 8-2-0-1

Preakness: 6-1-0-1

Belmont: 5-0-0-1

References

External links

Interview with wife at time of induction to Hall of fame

American jockeys
American Champion jockeys
1966 births
2000 deaths
Accidental deaths in California
Baptists from Florida
Sportspeople from Fort Lauderdale, Florida
People from Elloree, South Carolina
Drug-related deaths in California
Burials in South Carolina
20th-century Baptists